Lepidochrysops leucon is a butterfly in the family Lycaenidae. It is found on Madagascar.

References

Butterflies described in 1879
Lepidochrysops
Endemic fauna of Madagascar
Butterflies of Africa
Taxa named by Paul Mabille